Edmund Stuart Whitson Jr. (born May 18, 1941) is an American former politician in the state of Florida.

He served as a Republican in the Florida House of Representatives from 1967 to 1971, representing the 50th district, and from 1973 to 1974, this time representing the 55th district.

References

Living people
1941 births
Republican Party members of the Florida House of Representatives